Sovetsky District is an administrative district (raion), one of the twenty-six in Stavropol Krai, Russia. Municipally, it is incorporated as Sovetsky Municipal District. It is located in the south of the krai. Its administrative center is the town of Zelenokumsk. Population:  72,762 (2002 Census); 64,993 (1989 Census). The population of Zelenokumsk accounts for 57.1% of the district's population.

References

Notes

Sources

Districts of Stavropol Krai